Teodori is an Italian surname, the plural form of the more popular Teodoro. Notable people with the surname include:

 Massimo Teodori (born 1938), Italian author and politician
 Muriel Téodori (born 1958), French psychoanalyst

Italian-language surnames